T32 may refer to:

Convair T-32 or Convair C-131 Samaritan, American military transport produced from 1954 to 1956 by Convair
Curtiss T-32 Condor II, 1930s American biplane airliner and bomber aircraft built by the Curtiss Aeroplane and Motor Company
 ,  a German warship of World War II
General Aviation Design Bureau T-32 Maverick, Ukrainian ultralight trike under development by the General Aviation Design Bureau of Ukraine
London buses route T32 on List of bus routes in London, United Kingdom
Pratt & Whitney T32, a free-piston gas turbine project developed in the early 1940s
SOBER-t32, the first cipher, with a 17-byte Linear Feedback Shift Register, a form of decimation called stuttering, and a nonlinear output filter function
T32 (classification), a disability sport classification for disability athletics
T32 heavy tank, American tank